AppDynamics is a full-stack application performance management (APM) and IT operations analytics (ITOA) company based in San Francisco. The company focuses on managing the performance and availability of applications across cloud computing environments, IT infrastructure, network architecture, digital user experience design, application security threat detection, observability, and   data centers. In March 2017, AppDynamics was acquired by Cisco for $3.7 billion.
The software intelligence platform is used in enterprise and public sector SaaS applications such as the financial service sector, healthcare, telecom, manufacturing, and government for full-stack observability and IT infrastructure monitoring.

History and founding
AppDynamics was founded in 2008 by Jyoti Bansal, a former lead software architect at Wily Technologies, a provider of application performance management technology. AppDynamics received five rounds of funding totaling $206.5 Million.

In 2016, AppDynamics was ranked #9 on the Forbes Cloud 100 list.

In January 2017, Cisco announced their intention to acquire AppDynamics for $3.7 billion, just days before a planned IPO of the company. The move was seen as a continuation of Cisco's strategy of growing its software oriented business. 

In March 2017, Cisco completed the acquisition of AppDynamics.  AppDynamics is currently headed by Linda Tong as an independent business unit within Cisco's IoT and Applications business.

Industry Recognition

AppDynamics has been a leader in the APM market for more than eight years, and was ranked first in Gartner's 2020 Magic Quadrant Report for APM in the category of "ability to execute." As part of Cisco, it got and Fortune's top 5 Best Places to Work in 2020.

Controversies
On April 10, 2013, CA Technologies (formerly Computer Associates) filed a lawsuit in the US District Court for the Eastern District in New York.  The lawsuit claims that AppDynamics violated three patents that came into CA Technologies' possession through acquisitions. This was the second action CA Technologies filed in connection with alleged infringement of patents obtained in the acquisition of Wily Technology.  In November 2012, CA Technologies filed a lawsuit asserting patent infringement of the same three APM patents against software company, New Relic. On April 20, 2015, AppDynamics and CA settled the two-year-old patent dispute. AppDynamics said that it paid a "modest fixed payment."

Partnership with IBM 
AppDynamics and IBM have a collaboration using Z APM Connect with AppDynamics’ Map iQ and Diagnostic iQ, to provide mainframe transaction visibility.

Notes

External links 
 
 Unofficial AppDynamics Wiki - Service Monitoring Library

Software companies based in the San Francisco Bay Area
Software companies established in 2008
Companies based in San Francisco
Software performance management
Cisco Systems acquisitions
2017 mergers and acquisitions
2008 establishments in California
American companies established in 2008
Website monitoring software